Peter Odhiambo can refer to:

 Peter Odhiambo (boxer, born 1927), Ugandan boxer who competed at the 1960 Summer Olympics
 Peter Odhiambo (boxer, born 1950), Ugandan boxer who competed at the 1972 Summer Olympics
 Peter Odhiambo (boxer, born 1958), Ugandan boxer who competed at the 1980 Summer Olympics
 Peter Odhiambo (boxer, born 1966), Kenyan boxer who competed at the 1996 Summer Olympics
 Peter Paul Odhiambo (born 1937), Ugandan boxer who competed at the 1964 Summer Olympics
 Peter Amollo Odhiambo, Kenyan surgeon